The Gypsy Evangelical Mission in France (Life and Light) (Mission évangélique des Tziganes de France (Vie et Lumière)) is a Pentecostal church active among Roma.

History
The denomination has its origins in a mission founded by the Pastor Clément Le Cossec in 1952 in Brest.  In 1954, the "Gospel Mission of the Gypsies of France" held its first annual national convention.

In 2015, it would have 100,000 members and 260 churches. 

It also is present in several countries outside Western Europe. In several countries the GEM faces persecution.

See also
Light and Life (Roma church based in the United Kingdom)

References

External links
 Paloma Gay y Blasco, Gitano Evangelism: The Emergence of a Politico-Religious Diaspora  Paper presented at the 6th EASA Conference, Krakow 26-29 July 2000  

Evangelicalism in France
Pentecostal denominations in Europe